The Hopfner HS-8/29 was a utility aircraft built in Austria in the late 1920s based on the Hopfner HS-5/28. It used a modernised version of its predecessor's airframe, being a conventional, parasol-wing monoplane with seating for two occupants in tandem, open cockpits. The landing gear was of fixed, tailskid type with divided main units. The first prototype used the same Walter NZ 85 engine that the later HS-5/28s had used, but this was followed by 14 production examples with Siemens engines, and a single prototype with a de Havilland Gipsy III.

Variants
 HS-8/29 - version with Walter Venus, NZ 85 or Siemens Sh 14 engine (15 built)
 HS-8/29a - version with NZ 85 engine (1 built)
 HS-8/32 - HS-8/29a re-designated.

Specifications (HS-8/29 - Walter Venus engine)

References

Further reading

External links

 Уголок неба

1920s Austrian civil utility aircraft
Hopfner aircraft
Aircraft first flown in 1928
Single-engined tractor aircraft
Parasol-wing aircraft